"My Old Kentucky Home" is the third episode of the third season of the American television drama series Mad Men. It was written by Dahvi Waller and Matthew Weiner and directed by Jennifer Getzinger. The episode originally aired on the AMC channel in the United States on August 30, 2009.

Plot 
The creative department at Sterling Cooper is told they have to work the weekend to generate new concepts that are needed for the Bacardi rum account. Paul Kinsey calls up one of his Princeton pals to buy some marijuana to help spark their creativity. Peggy Olson smells the smoke and demands to be included, standing up to her colleagues for only ever asking her opinions on women's products. Shocking the men, Peggy gets stoned and eventually finds inspiration, returning to her office to reassure her overbearing secretary, Olive, that she is going to have all the success she wishes for her.

Joan and her husband Greg (Samuel Page) throw a dinner party for Greg's boss, the chief of surgery, and two of his fellow doctors and their wives. Greg argues with Joan about the table setting before their guests arrive. During dinner, Greg's boss and colleagues hint that he may not be the brilliant surgeon Joan believes him to be and that his possible promotion to Chief Resident may be at risk. To change the subject, Greg has Joan play the accordion and sing for their guests. Joan easily charms them, but is clearly troubled by what she has learned about Greg.

Roger Sterling and Jane Sterling (Peyton List) throw a Derby Party at a Country Club. In blackface Roger sings "My Old Kentucky Home" to Jane for their guests, amusing everyone but Don and Pete. Don wanders off to an unattended bar where he meets a man named Connie, who is also looking for a drink while avoiding a wedding reception. As Don makes drinks for the two of them, they trade stories about their modest beginnings.

As Betty is waiting for Trudy Campbell, a man approaches her and asks her about her pregnancy, requesting to touch her stomach. Later, the man is introduced to Don and Betty as Henry Francis (Christopher Stanley), an aide to Governor Rockefeller. Jane and Roger's guests begin dancing, and Pete and Trudy show off their elaborate Charleston and clearly rehearsed dance moves. A drunken Jane, who admits to not having eaten anything all day, gushes over Betty as she tries to help her, then tells her that she knew she and Don would get back together. Betty, furious, walks away as Jane asks Don why he doesn't like her. Roger comes upon them and asks what's going on, implying that Don was behaving inappropriately. He then confronts Don, who tells Roger no one is jealous of his supposed happiness and that everyone thinks he's a fool.

Reception 
The episode had a viewership of 1.608 million, which revealed growth in viewership compared to the previous season's third episode. The episode was the most watched program of the week.  The demographic was between the ages of 18–49.

Critical Reception for “My Old Kentucky Home” was critically acclaimed by many. Keith Phillips of The A.V. Club gave the episode an “A-”. He mentioned he was at a loss of words and in shock for several of the scenes. He especially pointed to the scene where Roger performs in blackface, as well as when Betty's stomach is touched by Henry Francis, which left Phillips thinking that Henry would appear in future episodes.

TV critic, Alan Sepinwall, responded with, “‘My Old Kentucky Home' is one of those Mad Men episodes where very little seems to happen in terms of story, but where the atmosphere and character work are both so rich that plot becomes irrelevant.” Sepinwall continued by saying he too was shocked with a few scenes, and also had hopes for Carla to be more involved in the season, since Carla has a unique perspective of the family.

In 2015, as part of New York City’s ongoing tribute to “Mad Men" at Alice Tully Hall at Lincoln Center, the show's creator Matthew Weiner explained the discomfort surrounding the writing, and then shooting, of the scene involving Roger in blackface. Weiner stated,  “There was a lot of controversy in the writers’ room. A lot of the writers were like, ‘you can’t do this.’ I was like, ‘Well, I think that season takes place in 1963 and blackface was not removed from the Philadelphia Police Parade until 1968 or something.’ That episode is about white people and what they’re like when they’re alone. We have a very diverse crew, and everyone understood what was happening, that it was a period piece, and it was not pleasurable for anyone. It was so well established that this was a part of the framework of that time, and it was so clear that we were criticizing it, but we had to live through doing it to criticize it.” In 2020, faced with calls to edit out the scene, a content warning was added to the episode on streaming platforms.

Production 
Series creator and executive producer, Matthew Weiner, wrote “My Old Kentucky Home” with Dahvi Waller. In an interview Matthew Weiner did with AMC, he revealed his vision and thoughts about important moments from the episode. He mentioned how the episode was shown in three parties; the different ages, classes, as well as who belongs where.

In Joan and Greg's party, they are seen for the first time since the incident that occurred in season two, showing that not only has she not left him, but is going to host a party for Greg. While the guests are over, it is mentioned that Greg has lost a patient, which Joan is unaware of. Instead of speaking about it further, Greg has Joan perform to win his guests over. Mathew wanted to emphasize the fact that Greg having Joan perform could be seen as a loving act, but it could also be interpreted as controlling. Weiner stated; “And the fact that he is keeping this appearance up to help himself, to cover for his own inadequacies, is very painful.” When the show's writers asked Christina Hendricks whether she could play the piano she told them of her accordion skill, which they incorporated into the story.

Weiner also wanted to highlight the fact that Don and Roger have different views on life. Don is not very understanding about Roger's choices, and seems to feel out of place at Roger's party.

Regarding Don and Betty's relationship, Weiner wanted to highlight on their marital status, and how even by the very end of the episode, after Betty has gotten hit on and Don noticing how in love Roger and Jane are, Betty and Don kiss. Although they kiss, they seem to be both kissing other people. Weiner wanted to reveal how Betty and Don want something else in this episode.

References

External links 
 "My Old Kentucky Home" at AMC
 "My Old Kentucky Home" on IMDb

Mad Men (season 3) episodes
2009 American television episodes